The United Jewish Appeal (UJA) was a Jewish philanthropic umbrella organization that existed from its creation in 1939 until it was folded into the United Jewish Communities, which was formed from the 1999 merger of United Jewish Appeal (UJA), Council of Jewish Federations and United Israel Appeal, Inc. In 2009, United Jewish Communities changed its name to The Jewish Federations of North America.

In January 1939, the United Jewish Appeal for Refugees and Overseas Needs was established, combining the efforts of American Jewish Joint Distribution Committee, led by Rabbi Jonah Wise; the United Israel Appeal, led by Rabbi Abba Hillel Silver; and the National Coordinating Committee Fund led by William Rosenwald. The three founders emphasized that the funds needed to support Jews in Europe and Israel would be triple to quadruple the amount raised in the previous year. While the organizations would raise funds together, the Joint Distribution Committee would assist Jews in Europe, the United Israel Appeal would aid the Jewish community in Israel, including refugees from Europe arriving there and the National Coordinating Committee Fund would assist refugees arriving in the United States.

In 1999, the UJA merged with the Council of Jewish Federations and United Israel Appeal, Inc. to form a combined entity that would be called the United Jewish Communities. While the organizations had been raising more than $1 billion annually, they had faced concerns that the individual organizations were not as relevant as during the Holocaust and the creation of the State of Israel, with many major donors seeking to direct their philanthropy through their own foundations rather than through the umbrella organizations. The balance of power would shift to the federations, which would select about two-thirds of the 120 members on the board of trustees of the new organization. Businessman and philanthropist Charles Bronfman was chosen as the volunteer chairman of the combined entity, responsible for planning the group's strategic direction.

Cultural allusions
In the Woody Allen film Bananas, the dictatorial president of the fictional country of San Marcos accidentally calls upon the UJA, instead of the CIA, to help prevent a coup. The result is that as fighting swirls in the streets around him, at least one rabbi can be seen soliciting donations from combat troops.

References

External links
Records of the United Jewish Appeal-Federation of New York held at the American Jewish Historical Society, New York, NY

Jewish-American political organizations
Jewish community organizations
Jewish charities based in the United States
Zionism in the United States
Jewish Federations of North America